Thorunna purpuropedis is a species of sea slug, a dorid nudibranch, a shell-less marine gastropod mollusk in the family Chromodorididae.

Distribution 
This species was described from Enewetak Atoll, Marshall Islands. It has been reported from Japan.

Description

Ecology

References

Chromodorididae
Gastropods described in 1985